Iowa State Armory was a 7,500-seat multi-purpose arena in Ames, Iowa.   It was home to the Iowa State University Cyclones basketball team until Hilton Coliseum opened in 1971. The main floor of the arena now serves as project space for the College of Design. Other tenants of the building include the Department of Public Safety as well as Army, Navy, and Air Force ROTC.

Notes

References

External links
 Arena information
https://www.flickr.com/photos/isuspecialcollections/2274397829/

Indoor arenas in Iowa
Defunct college basketball venues in the United States
Defunct sports venues in Iowa
Iowa State Cyclones basketball venues